This is a list of members of the Oireachtas (National Parliament of Ireland) who served a prison sentence or were interned during the Irish revolutionary period (1916–23) in any jurisdiction before, during or after their time as a Teachta Dála (TD) or Senator.

Many were imprisoned as a result of their actions against the British Government in the lead-up to the formation of the Irish Free State in 1922. The list is ordered by first term of imprisonment.

See also
List of members of the Oireachtas imprisoned since 1923
Records of members of the Oireachtas

References

Lists of political office-holders in Ireland
 
 
Imprisoned